Déclassée, listed as Déclassé on some posters, is a 1925 American silent drama film of manners produced and released by First National Pictures in association with Corinne Griffith as executive producer. Griffith also stars in the production which was directed by Robert G. Vignola and based on the 1919 play by Zoë Akins that starred Ethel Barrymore.

A young and unknown Clark Gable made an uncredited appearance.

The film was remade as an early talkie in 1929 titled Her Private Life starring Billie Dove.

Plot
As described in a film magazine review, Lady Helen, married to a brute, finds in Ned Thayer's companionship the one spark of joy in her life. Ned is accused of cheating at cards and Lady Helen forces her husband to apologize. Ned is forced by his sister-in-law to help her cheat under the threat to show Sir Bruce the letter in which Lady Helen avows her love for Ted. Lady Helen sees the card cheating and forces Ned to apologize to her husband. The letter is given to Sir Bruce, who then divorces his wife. Through the resulting scandal, Helen becomes déclassé in London society, and drifts to New York City, where the wealthy Rudolph Solomon pursues her to become his mistress. When she is about to succumb, being at the end of her resources, at the last moment she throws herself under an automobile. Ned Thayer, having returned, rescues her and the promise comes of their union.

Cast

Preservation
A print of this film resides in the British Film Institute National Archive with a trailer surviving at the Library of Congress.

References

External links

Lobby cards and stills at silenthollywood.com

1925 films
1925 drama films
Silent American drama films
American silent feature films
American black-and-white films
American films based on plays
Films directed by Robert G. Vignola
First National Pictures films
Films scored by Leo Fall
1920s American films